Morana is a 1994 Slovenian horror film directed by Aleš Verbič. The film was selected as the Slovenian entry for the Best Foreign Language Film at the 67th Academy Awards, but was not accepted as a nominee.

Cast
 Tanja Dimitrievska as Mojca
 Damjana Grasic as Milena
 Urska Hlebec as Vesna
 Iztok Jereb as Vladimir
 Zoran More as Samo
 Pavle Ravnohrib as Borut
 Natasa Tic Ralijan as Ana (as Natasa Ralijan)
 Borut Veselko as Crt
 Branko Zavrsan as Gorazd
 Vojko Zidar as Rado

See also
 List of submissions to the 67th Academy Awards for Best Foreign Language Film
 List of Slovenian submissions for the Academy Award for Best Foreign Language Film
Morana (goddess)

References

External links
 

1994 films
1994 horror films
Slovene-language films
Folk horror films